Speedland: The Premium Best Re Tracks is a greatest hits package by Japanese female pop group, Speed, released on August 5, 2009. It features several brand new recordings of their past hits completely reworked and rearranged. Their debut single, "Body & Soul" and "White Love" are some of the songs tentatively being included on the album. It is released in a regular single disc edition and a CD+DVD edition. First pressings of the album include a cellphone strap and a poster.

Track listing

CD

DVD

Chart performance

References 

Speed (Japanese band) albums
2009 compilation albums